Leandro Lautaro Lacunza (born 21 July 1997) is an Argentine professional footballer who plays as a right-back for Chacarita Juniors.

Career
Lacunza's senior career got underway with Olimpo, after he had come through the youth system of Rosario Puerto Belgrano. Christian Díaz selected him for his debut during the 2016 Primera División, with Lacunza playing the full duration of a home draw against Banfield on 9 May. He made another appearance a week later versus Patronato, though ended the match prematurely after eighty-one minutes due to a red card. He wasn't picked in any competitive matches throughout 2016–17, but went on to feature nine times in 2017–18 as the club suffered relegation.

On 20 November 2020, Lacunza joined Primera Nacional club Guillermo Brown. Ahead of the 2022 season, he moved to fellow league club Chacarita Juniors.

Career statistics
.

References

External links

1997 births
Living people
Sportspeople from Buenos Aires Province
Argentine footballers
Association football defenders
Argentine Primera División players
Primera Nacional players
Olimpo footballers
Guillermo Brown de Puerto Madryn footballers
Chacarita Juniors footballers